This is a list of butterflies of Gabon. About 667 species are known from Gabon, 24 of which are endemic.

Papilionidae

Papilioninae

Papilionini
Papilio antimachus Drury, 1782
Papilio zalmoxis Hewitson, 1864
Papilio nireus Linnaeus, 1758
Papilio chrapkowskoides nurettini Koçak, 1983
Papilio sosia pulchra Berger, 1950
Papilio dardanus Brown, 1776
Papilio phorcas congoanus Rothschild, 1896

Leptocercini
Graphium antheus (Cramer, 1779)
Graphium policenes (Cramer, 1775)
Graphium biokoensis (Gauthier, 1984)
Graphium policenoides (Holland, 1892)
Graphium colonna (Ward, 1873)
Graphium illyris hamatus (Joicey & Talbot, 1918)
Graphium ridleyanus (White, 1843)
Graphium leonidas (Fabricius, 1793)
Graphium tynderaeus (Fabricius, 1793)
Graphium latreillianus theorini (Aurivillius, 1881)
Graphium auriger (Butler, 1876)
Graphium fulleri boulleti (Le Cerf, 1912)
Graphium hachei (Dewitz, 1881)
Graphium ucalegon (Hewitson, 1865)
Graphium simoni (Aurivillius, 1899)

Pieridae

Pseudopontiinae
Pseudopontia paradoxa (Felder & Felder, 1869)

Coliadinae
Eurema brigitta (Stoll, [1780])
Eurema hecabe solifera (Butler, 1875)
Catopsilia florella (Fabricius, 1775)

Pierinae
Colotis celimene sudanicus (Aurivillius, 1905)
Leptosia alcesta (Stoll, [1782])
Leptosia hybrida Bernardi, 1952
Leptosia marginea (Mabille, 1890)
Leptosia nupta (Butler, 1873)

Pierini
Appias epaphia (Cramer, [1779])
Appias perlucens (Butler, 1898)
Appias sabina (Felder & Felder, [1865])
Mylothris asphodelus Butler, 1888
Mylothris basalis Aurivillius, 1906
Mylothris bernice (Hewitson, 1866)
Mylothris chloris (Fabricius, 1775)
Mylothris elodina Talbot, 1944
Mylothris nubila (Möschler, 1884)
Mylothris rembina (Plötz, 1880)
Dixeia capricornus falkensteinii (Dewitz, 1879)
Dixeia cebron (Ward, 1871)
Belenois aurota (Fabricius, 1793)
Belenois solilucis Butler, 1874
Belenois theuszi (Dewitz, 1889)

Lycaenidae

Miletinae

Liphyrini
Euliphyra mirifica Holland, 1890
Euliphyra leucyania (Hewitson, 1874)
Aslauga aura Druce, 1913
Aslauga confusa Libert, 1994
Aslauga purpurascens Holland, 1890
Aslauga vininga (Hewitson, 1875)

Miletini
Megalopalpus simplex Röber, 1886
Megalopalpus zymna (Westwood, 1851)
Spalgis lemolea Druce, 1890
Lachnocnema emperamus (Snellen, 1872)
Lachnocnema divergens Gaede, 1915
Lachnocnema reutlingeri Holland, 1892
Lachnocnema luna Druce, 1910
Lachnocnema exiguus Holland, 1890

Poritiinae

Liptenini
Ptelina carnuta (Hewitson, 1873)
Pentila maculata pardalena Druce, 1910
Pentila amenaidoides (Holland, 1893)
Pentila cloetensi aspasia Grünberg, 1910
Pentila glagoessa (Holland, 1893)
Pentila hewitsoni limbata (Holland, 1893)
Pentila occidentalium gabunica Stempffer & Bennett, 1961
Pentila pauli leopardina Schultze, 1923
Pentila rotha Hewitson, 1873
Pentila tachyroides Dewitz, 1879
Pentila torrida (Kirby, 1887)
Pentila umbra Holland, 1892
Telipna albofasciata Aurivillius, 1910
Telipna cameroonensis Jackson, 1969
Telipna atrinervis Hulstaert, 1924
Telipna villiersi Stempffer, 1965
Telipna hollandi exsuperia Hulstaert, 1924
Telipna transverstigma Druce, 1910
Telipna sanguinea (Plötz, 1880)
Telipna erica Suffert, 1904
Telipna ruspinoides Schultze, 1923
Ornipholidotos kirbyi (Aurivillius. 1895)
Ornipholidotos ugandae goodi Libert, 2000
Ornipholidotos bitjeensis Stempffer, 1957
Ornipholidotos gabonensis Stempffer, 1947
Ornipholidotos bakotae Stempffer, 1962
Ornipholidotos ayissii Libert, 2005
Ornipholidotos annae Libert, 2005
Ornipholidotos evoei Libert, 2005
Ornipholidotos overlaeti fontainei Libert, 2005
Ornipholidotos congoensis Stempffer, 1964
Ornipholidotos jacksoni occidentalis Libert, 2005
Ornipholidotos irwini Collins & Larsen, 1998
Ornipholidotos tirza (Hewitson, 1873)
Ornipholidotos perfragilis (Holland, 1890)
Ornipholidotos sylphida (Staudinger, 1892)
Torbenia aurivilliusi (Stempffer, 1967)
Torbenia persimilis Libert, 2000
Mimacraea darwinia Butler, 1872
Mimacraea apicalis gabonica Libert, 2000
Mimeresia cellularis (Kirby, 1890)
Mimeresia debora (Kirby, 1890)
Mimeresia favillacea (Grünberg, 1910)
Mimeresia libentina (Hewitson, 1866)
Mimeresia moreelsi tessmanni (Grünberg, 1910)
Liptena bolivari Kheil, 1905
Liptena catalina (Grose-Smith & Kirby, 1887)
Liptena decipiens leucostola (Holland, 1890)
Liptena despecta (Holland, 1890)
Liptena evanescens (Kirby, 1887)
Liptena fatima (Kirby, 1890)
Liptena flavicans praeusta Schultze, 1917
Liptena modesta (Kirby, 1890)
Liptena opaca gabunica Stempffer, Bennett & May, 1974
Liptena orubrum (Holland, 1890)
Liptena similis (Kirby, 1890)
Liptena subundularis (Staudinger, 1892)
Liptena turbata (Kirby, 1890)
Liptena undularis Hewitson, 1866
Liptena xanthostola (Holland, 1890)
Obania tullia (Staudinger, 1892)
Kakumia ideoides (Dewitz, 1887)
Kakumia otlauga (Grose-Smith & Kirby, 1890)
Tetrarhanis ilala etoumbi (Stempffer, 1964)
Tetrarhanis laminifer Clench, 1965
Tetrarhanis rougeoti (Stempffer, 1954)
Falcuna campimus dilatata (Schultze, 1923)
Falcuna lybia (Staudinger, 1892)
Falcuna margarita (Suffert, 1904)
Falcuna melandeta (Holland, 1893)
Falcuna synesia gabonensis Stempffer & Bennett, 1963
Larinopoda lagyra (Hewitson, 1866)
Larinopoda lircaea (Hewitson, 1866)
Larinopoda tera (Hewitson, 1873)
Micropentila adelgitha (Hewitson, 1874)
Micropentila adelgunda (Staudinger, 1892)
Micropentila alberta (Staudinger, 1892)
Micropentila brunnea centralis Bennett, 1966
Micropentila cingulum Druce, 1910
Micropentila dorothea Bethune-Baker, 1903
Micropentila gabunica Stempffer & Bennett, 1965
Micropentila ugandae  Hawker-Smith, 1933
Micropentila villiersi Stempffer, 1970
Pseuderesia mapongua (Holland, 1893)
Eresiomera cornucopiae (Holland, 1892)
Eresina corynetes (Grose-Smith & Kirby, 1890)
Eresina rougeoti Stempffer, 1956
Eresiomera clenchi (Stempffer, 1961)
Eresiomera cornucopiae (Holland, 1892)
Eresiomera isca (Hewitson, 1873)
Eresiomera mapongwa (Holland, 1893)
Eresiomera osheba (Holland, 1890)
Eresiomera rougeoti (Stempffer, 1961)
Eresiomera rutilo (Druce, 1910)
Citrinophila bennetti Jackson, 1967
Citrinophila erastus (Hewitson, 1866)
Citrinophila tenera (Kirby, 1887)
Citrinophila terias Joicey & Talbot, 1921
Argyrocheila undifera Staudinger, 1892

Epitolini
Iridana exquisita (Grose-Smith, 1898)
Iridana gabunica Stempffer, 1964
Iridana rougeoti Stempffer, 1964
Epitola posthumus (Fabricius, 1793)
Epitola urania Kirby, 1887
Cerautola ceraunia (Hewitson, 1873)
Cerautola crowleyi leucographa Libert, 1999
Cerautola miranda vidua (Talbot, 1935)
Cerautola stempfferi (Jackson, 1962)
Geritola gerina (Hewitson, 1878)
Geritola goodii (Holland, 1890)
Stempfferia annae Libert, 1999
Stempfferia badura (Kirby, 1890)
Stempfferia bouyeri Libert & Collins, 1999
Stempfferia cercenoides (Holland, 1890)
Stempfferia congoana (Aurivillius, 1923)
Stempfferia gordoni (Druce, 1903)
Stempfferia iturina (Joicey & Talbot, 1921)
Stempfferia marginata (Kirby, 1887)
Stempfferia michelae centralis Libert, 1999
Stempfferia similis Libert, 1999
Stempfferia zelza (Hewitson, 1873)
Cephetola catuna (Kirby, 1890)
Cephetola cephena (Hewitson, 1873)
Cephetola nigeriae (Jackson, 1962)
Cephetola orientalis (Roche, 1954)
Epitolina dispar (Kirby, 1887)
Epitolina melissa (Druce, 1888)
Epitolina larseni Libert, 2000
Hypophytala benitensis (Holland, 1890)
Hypophytala hyetta (Hewitson, 1873)
Phytala elais Westwood, 1851
Aethiopana honorius (Fabricius, 1793)
Hewitsonia bitjeana Bethune-Baker, 1915
Hewitsonia boisduvalii (Hewitson, 1869)
Hewitsonia kirbyi Dewitz, 1879
Hewitsonia similis (Aurivillius, 1891)
Hewitsonia ugandae jolyana Bouyer, 1997

Aphnaeinae
Pseudaletis zebra Holland, 1891
Pseudaletis antimachus (Staudinger, 1888)
Cigaritis crustaria (Holland, 1890)
Cigaritis homeyeri (Dewitz, 1887)
Aphnaeus argyrocyclus Holland, 1890
Aphnaeus asterius Plötz, 1880
Aphnaeus orcas (Drury, 1782)

Theclinae
Syrmoptera amasa (Hewitson, 1869)
Syrmoptera melanomitra Karsch, 1895
Hypolycaena hatita Hewitson, 1865
Hypolycaena lebona (Hewitson, 1865)
Hypolycaena naara Hewitson, 1873
Hypolycaena nigra Bethune-Baker, 1914
Iolaus bolissus Hewitson, 1873
Iolaus carina Hewitson, 1873
Iolaus eurisus vexillarius Clench, 1964
Iolaus aurivillii Röber, 1900
Iolaus bellina exquisita (Riley, 1928)
Iolaus coelestis Bethune-Baker, 1926
Iolaus creta Hewitson, 1878
Iolaus cytaeis Hewitson, 1875
Iolaus iasis Hewitson, 1865
Iolaus pollux Aurivillius, 1895
Iolaus gabunica (Riley, 1928)
Iolaus iulus Hewitson, 1869
Iolaus parasilanus mabillei (Riley, 1928)
Iolaus alcibiades Kirby, 1871
Iolaus calisto (Westwood, 1851)
Iolaus aequatorialis (Stempffer & Bennett, 1958)
Iolaus timon (Fabricius, 1787)
Pilodeudorix mimeta (Karsch, 1895)
Pilodeudorix ula (Karsch, 1895)
Pilodeudorix virgata (Druce, 1891)
Pilodeudorix angelita (Suffert, 1904)
Pilodeudorix aruma (Hewitson, 1873)
Pilodeudorix mera (Hewitson, 1873)
Pilodeudorix otraeda genuba (Hewitson, 1875)
Pilodeudorix camerona (Plötz, 1880)
Pilodeudorix congoana (Aurivillius, 1923)
Pilodeudorix hugoi Libert, 2004
Pilodeudorix corruscans (Aurivillius, 1898)
Pilodeudorix violetta (Aurivillius, 1897)
Paradeudorix cobaltina (Stempffer, 1964)
Paradeudorix ituri (Bethune-Baker, 1908)
Paradeudorix moyambina (Bethune-Baker, 1904)
Hypomyrina fournierae Gabriel, 1939
Deudorix galathea (Swainson, 1821)
Deudorix lorisona (Hewitson, 1862)

Polyommatinae

Lycaenesthini
Anthene erythropoecilus (Holland, 1893)
Anthene lachares (Hewitson, 1878)
Anthene leptines (Hewitson, 1874)
Anthene ligures (Hewitson, 1874)
Anthene liodes (Hewitson, 1874)
Anthene lychnaptes (Holland, 1891)
Anthene lysicles (Hewitson, 1874)
Anthene mahota (Grose-Smith, 1887)
Anthene melambrotus (Holland, 1893)
Anthene pyroptera (Aurivillius, 1895)
Anthene rubricinctus (Holland, 1891)
Anthene scintillula (Holland, 1891)
Anthene sylvanus (Drury, 1773)
Anthene versatilis (Bethune-Baker, 1910)
Anthene xanthopoecilus (Holland, 1893)
Anthene lyzanius (Hewitson, 1874)
Anthene lusones (Hewitson, 1874)
Anthene staudingeri (Grose-Smith & Kirby, 1894)
Anthene fasciatus (Aurivillius, 1895)
Anthene hades (Bethune-Baker, 1910)
Anthene lacides (Hewitson, 1874)
Anthene lamias (Hewitson, 1878)
Anthene lucretilis (Hewitson, 1874)
Anthene obscura (Druce, 1910)
Anthene oculatus (Grose-Smith & Kirby, 1893)
Anthene rufoplagata (Bethune-Baker, 1910)
Anthene tisamenus (Holland, 1891)
Cupidesthes arescopa Bethune-Baker, 1910
Cupidesthes leonina (Bethune-Baker, 1903)
Cupidesthes lithas (Druce, 1890)
Cupidesthes paludicola (Holland, 1891)
Cupidesthes thyrsis (Kirby, 1878)

Polyommatini
Cupidopsis cissus extensa Libert, 2003
Pseudonacaduba aethiops (Mabille, 1877)
Phlyaria cyara (Hewitson, 1876)
Tuxentius carana (Hewitson, 1876)
Thermoniphas alberici (Dufrane, 1945)
Thermoniphas fontainei Stempffer, 1956
Thermoniphas fumosa Stempffer, 1952
Thermoniphas leucocyanea Clench, 1961
Thermoniphas togara (Plötz, 1880)
Oboronia ornata vestalis (Aurivillius, 1895)
Oboronia pseudopunctatus (Strand, 1912)
Lepidochrysops glauca (Trimen & Bowker, 1887)

Riodinidae

Nemeobiinae
Abisara caeca semicaeca Riley, 1932
Abisara rutherfordii herwigii Dewitz, 1887
Abisara gerontes gabunica Riley, 1932

Nymphalidae

Danainae

Danaini
Danaus chrysippus orientis (Aurivillius, 1909)
Tirumala formosa morgeni (Honrath, 1892)
Amauris niavius (Linnaeus, 1758)
Amauris tartarea Mabille, 1876
Amauris hyalites Butler, 1874
Amauris inferna Butler, 1871
Amauris vashti (Butler, 1869)

Satyrinae

Elymniini
Elymniopsis bammakoo (Westwood, [1851])

Melanitini
Gnophodes chelys (Fabricius, 1793)

Satyrini
Bicyclus evadne elionias (Hewitson, 1866)
Bicyclus hewitsoni (Doumet, 1861)
Bicyclus howarthi Condamin, 1963
Bicyclus ignobilis eurini Condamin & Fox, 1963
Bicyclus italus (Hewitson, 1865)
Bicyclus lamani (Aurivillius, 1900)
Bicyclus madetes (Hewitson, 1874)
Bicyclus mandanes Hewitson, 1873
Bicyclus medontias (Hewitson, 1873)
Bicyclus nobilis (Aurivillius, 1893)
Bicyclus rhacotis (Hewitson, 1866)
Bicyclus sambulos (Hewitson, 1877)
Bicyclus sciathis (Hewitson, 1866)
Bicyclus taenias (Hewitson, 1877)
Bicyclus technatis (Hewitson, 1877)
Bicyclus trilophus (Rebel, 1914)
Bicyclus xeneas (Hewitson, 1866)
Bicyclus xeneoides Condamin, 1961
Heteropsis peitho (Plötz, 1880)
Ypthima doleta Kirby, 1880
Ypthima impura Elwes & Edwards, 1893

Charaxinae

Charaxini
Charaxes fulvescens (Aurivillius, 1891)
Charaxes protoclea protonothodes van Someren, 1971
Charaxes boueti Feisthamel, 1850
Charaxes cynthia kinduana Le Cerf, 1923
Charaxes lucretius intermedius van Someren, 1971
Charaxes jasius brunnescens Poulton, 1926
Charaxes castor (Cramer, 1775)
Charaxes brutus angustus Rothschild, 1900
Charaxes eudoxus mechowi Rothschild, 1900
Charaxes richelmanni Röber, 1936
Charaxes numenes aequatorialis van Someren, 1972
Charaxes tiridates tiridatinus Röber, 1936
Charaxes bipunctatus ugandensis van Someren, 1972
Charaxes mixtus Rothschild, 1894
Charaxes smaragdalis Butler, 1866
Charaxes ameliae Doumet, 1861
Charaxes pythodoris occidens van Someren, 1963
Charaxes hadrianus Ward, 1871
Charaxes nobilis Druce, 1873
Charaxes superbus Schultze, 1909
Charaxes lydiae Holland, 1917
Charaxes acraeoides Druce, 1908
Charaxes fournierae Le Moult, 1930
Charaxes etesipe (Godart, 1824)
Charaxes bwete (Basquin, 2012)
Charaxes eupale latimargo Joicey & Talbot, 1921
Charaxes subornatus Schultze, 1916
Charaxes anticlea proadusta van Someren, 1971
Charaxes thysi Capronnier, 1889
Charaxes taverniersi Berger, 1975
Charaxes hildebrandti (Dewitz, 1879)
Charaxes etheocles ochracea van Someren & Jackson, 1957
Charaxes bocqueti oubanguiensis , 1975
Charaxes cedreatis Hewitson, 1874
Charaxes kheili Staudinger, 1896
Charaxes pleione congoensis Plantrou, 1989
Charaxes paphianus Ward, 1871
Charaxes kahldeni Homeyer & Dewitz, 1882
Charaxes nichetes Grose-Smith, 1883
Charaxes lycurgus bernardiana Plantrou, 1978
Charaxes zelica rougeoti Plantrou, 1978
Charaxes porthos Grose-Smith, 1883
Charaxes mycerina nausicaa Staudinger, 1891

Euxanthini
Charaxes eurinome ansellica (Butler, 1870)
Charaxes eurinome celadon Le Cerf, 1923
Charaxes crossleyi (Ward, 1871)
Charaxes trajanus (Ward, 1871)

Pallini
Palla publius centralis van Someren, 1975
Palla ussheri dobelli (Hall, 1919)

Apaturinae
Apaturopsis cleochares (Hewitson, 1873)

Nymphalinae
Kallimoides rumia jadyae (Fox, 1968)
Vanessula milca buechneri Dewitz, 1887

Nymphalini
Junonia stygia (Aurivillius, 1894)
Junonia terea (Drury, 1773)
Salamis cacta (Fabricius, 1793)
Protogoniomorpha parhassus (Drury, 1782)
Precis octavia (Cramer, 1777)
Hypolimnas anthedon (Doubleday, 1845)
Hypolimnas dinarcha (Hewitson, 1865)
Hypolimnas misippus (Linnaeus, 1764)
Hypolimnas monteironis (Druce, 1874)
Hypolimnas salmacis (Drury, 1773)

Biblidinae

Biblidini
Mesoxantha ethosea ethoseoides Rebel, 1914
Ariadne actisanes (Hewitson, 1875)
Ariadne enotrea suffusa (Joicey & Talbot, 1921)
Neptidopsis ophione (Cramer, 1777)

Epicaliini
Sevenia amulia (Cramer, 1777)
Sevenia occidentalium (Mabille, 1876)

Limenitinae

Limenitidini
Cymothoe amenides (Hewitson, 1874)
Cymothoe anitorgis (Hewitson, 1874)
Cymothoe aramis (Hewitson, 1865)
Cymothoe beckeri (Herrich-Schaeffer, 1858)
Cymothoe capella (Ward, 1871)
Cymothoe coccinata (Hewitson, 1874)
Cymothoe confusa Aurivillius, 1887
Cymothoe fumana balluca Fox & Howarth, 1968
Cymothoe harmilla (Hewitson, 1874)
Cymothoe haynae superba Aurivillius, 1899
Cymothoe hesiodotus Staudinger, 1890
Cymothoe hypatha (Hewitson, 1866)
Cymothoe lucasii (Doumet, 1859)
Cymothoe lurida hesione Weymer, 1907
Cymothoe oemilius (Doumet, 1859)
Cymothoe ogova (Plötz, 1880)
Cymothoe reinholdi (Plötz, 1880)
Pseudacraea boisduvalii (Doubleday, 1845)
Pseudacraea clarkii Butler & Rothschild, 1892
Pseudacraea dolomena (Hewitson, 1865)
Pseudacraea rubrobasalis Aurivillius, 1903
Pseudacraea eurytus (Linnaeus, 1758)
Pseudacraea kuenowii gottbergi Dewitz, 1884
Pseudacraea lucretia protracta (Butler, 1874)
Pseudacraea semire (Cramer, 1779)

Neptidini
Neptis agouale Pierre-Baltus, 1978
Neptis continuata Holland, 1892
Neptis dentifera Schultze, 1920
Neptis matilei Pierre-Balthus, 20
Neptis melicerta (Drury, 1773)
Neptis metanira Holland, 1892
Neptis mixophyes Holland, 1892
Neptis morosa Overlaet, 1955
Neptis nebrodes Hewitson, 1874
Neptis nemetes margueriteae Fox, 1968
Neptis nicobule Holland, 1892
Neptis nicoteles Hewitson, 1874
Neptis stellata Pierre-Baltus, 2007
Neptis rosa Pierre-Baltus, 2007
Neptis amieti Pierre-Baltus, 2007
Neptis multiscoliata Pierre-Baltus, 2007
Neptis mpassae Pierre-Baltus, 2007
Neptis nigra Pierre-Baltus, 2007
Neptis trigonophora melicertula Strand, 1912
Neptis troundi Pierre-Baltus, 1978

Adoliadini
Catuna angustatum (Felder & Felder, 1867)
Catuna niji Fox, 1965
Euryphura chalcis (Felder & Felder, 1860)
Euryphura plautilla (Hewitson, 1865)
Euryphura porphyrion grassei Bernardi, 1965
Euryphaedra thauma Staudinger, 1891
Harmilla elegans Aurivillius, 1892
Aterica galene extensa Heron, 1909
Cynandra opis bernardii Lagnel, 1967
Euriphene abasa (Hewitson, 1866)
Euriphene atropurpurea (Aurivillius, 1894)
Euriphene atrovirens (Mabille, 1878)
Euriphene barombina (Aurivillius, 1894)
Euriphene camarensis (Ward, 1871)
Euriphene gambiae gabonica Bernardi, 1966
Euriphene glaucopis (Gaede, 1916)
Euriphene grosesmithi (Staudinger, 1891)
Euriphene karschi (Aurivillius, 1894)
Euriphene minkoi Bernardi, 1993
Euriphene mundula (Grünberg, 1910)
Euriphene pinkieana Bernardi, 1975
Euriphene plagiata (Aurivillius, 1897)
Euriphene tadema (Hewitson, 1866)
Euriphene doriclea (Drury, 1782)
Euriphene lysandra (Stoll, 1790)
Bebearia carshena (Hewitson, 1871)
Bebearia micans (Aurivillius, 1899)
Bebearia zonara (Butler, 1871)
Bebearia mandinga (Felder & Felder, 1860)
Bebearia oxione squalida (Talbot, 1928)
Bebearia abesa (Hewitson, 1869)
Bebearia cocalia katera (van Someren, 1939)
Bebearia sophus (Fabricius, 1793)
Bebearia staudingeri (Aurivillius, 1893)
Bebearia plistonax (Hewitson, 1874)
Bebearia elpinice (Hewitson, 1869)
Bebearia congolensis (Capronnier, 1889)
Bebearia laetitia (Plötz, 1880)
Bebearia maximiana ata Hecq, 1990
Bebearia nivaria (Ward, 1871)
Bebearia phantasia concolor Hecq, 1988
Bebearia demetra obsolescens (Talbot, 1928)
Bebearia tessmanni (Grünberg, 1910)
Bebearia cutteri cognata (Grünberg, 1910)
Bebearia eliensis (Hewitson, 1866)
Bebearia octogramma (Grose-Smith & Kirby, 1889)
Bebearia castanea (Holland, 1893)
Bebearia chilonis (Hewitson, 1874)
Bebearia cinaethon (Hewitson, 1874)
Bebearia faraveli Oremans, 1998
Bebearia intermedia (Bartel, 1905)
Bebearia ivindoensis van de Weghe, 2007
Bebearia lopeensis van de Weghe, 2007
Bebearia oremansi Hecq, 1994
Bebearia tini Oremans, 1998
Euphaedra luteofasciata Hecq, 1979
Euphaedra imperialis gabonica Rothschild, 1918
Euphaedra medon sanctanna Hecq, 1985
Euphaedra medon celestis Hecq, 1986
Euphaedra medon viridinota (Butler, 1871)
Euphaedra zaddachii Dewitz, 1879
Euphaedra mondahensis van de Weghe, Oremans & Hecq, 2005
Euphaedra hewitsoni Hecq, 1974
Euphaedra diffusa Gaede, 1916
Euphaedra ansorgei Rothschild, 1918
Euphaedra imitans Holland, 1893
Euphaedra vandeweghei Hecq, 2004
Euphaedra permixtum (Butler, 1873)
Euphaedra campaspe (Felder & Felder, 1867)
Euphaedra justicia Staudinger, 1886
Euphaedra piriformis Hecq, 1982
Euphaedra uniformis Berger, 1981
Euphaedra ceres electra Hecq, 1983
Euphaedra fontainei Hecq, 1977
Euphaedra rezia (Hewitson, 1866)
Euphaedra jacksoni Hecq, 1980
Euphaedra dargeana Hecq, 1980
Euphaedra subprotea Hecq, 1986
Euphaedra eleus (Drury, 1782)
Euphaedra variabilis Guillaumin, 1976
Euphaedra edwardsii (van der Hoeven, 1845)
Euphaedra ruspina (Hewitson, 1865)
Euphaedra harpalyce spatiosa (Mabille, 1876)
Euphaedra temeraria Hecq, 2007
Euphaedra opulenta Hecq & Van de Weghe, 2005
Euphaedra limbourgi Oremans, 2006
Euphaedra abri Faravel, 2005
Euphaedra sabinae Faravel, 2002
Euptera amieti Collins & Libert, 1998
Euptera choveti Amiet & Collins, 1998
Euptera elabontas (Hewitson, 1871)
Euptera falsathyma Schultze, 1916
Euptera hirundo Staudinger, 1891
Euptera pluto (Ward, 1873)
Euptera semirufa Joicey & Talbot, 1921
Pseudathyma callina (Grose-Smith, 1898)
Pseudathyma michelae Libert, 2002

Heliconiinae

Acraeini
Acraea admatha Hewitson, 1865
Acraea endoscota Le Doux, 1928
Acraea leucographa Ribbe, 1889
Acraea neobule Doubleday, 1847
Acraea quirina (Fabricius, 1781)
Acraea cepheus (Linnaeus, 1758)
Acraea egina (Cramer, 1775)
Acraea pseudegina Westwood, 1852
Acraea consanguinea (Aurivillius, 1893)
Acraea elongata (Butler, 1874)
Acraea epiprotea (Butler, 1874)
Acraea excisa (Butler, 1874)
Acraea macarista latefasciata (Suffert, 1904)
Acraea umbra macarioides (Aurivillius, 1893)
Acraea vestalis stavelia (Suffert, 1904)
Acraea althoffi bitjana Bethune-Baker, 1926
Acraea aurivillii Staudinger, 1896
Acraea encoda Pierre, 1981
Acraea serena (Fabricius, 1775)
Acraea jodutta (Fabricius, 1793)
Acraea orestia Hewitson, 1874
Acraea pentapolis Ward, 1871

Vagrantini
Lachnoptera anticlia (Hübner, 1819)
Phalanta eurytis (Doubleday, 1847)
Phalanta phalantha aethiopica (Rothschild & Jordan, 1903)

Hesperiidae

Coeliadinae
Coeliades chalybe (Westwood, 1852)
Coeliades forestan (Stoll, [1782])
Coeliades hanno (Plötz, 1879)
Coeliades pisistratus (Fabricius, 1793)
Pyrrhochalcia iphis (Drury, 1773)

Pyrginae

Celaenorrhinini
Loxolexis dimidia (Holland, 1896)
Celaenorrhinus boadicea (Hewitson, 1877)
Celaenorrhinus illustris (Mabille, 1891)
Celaenorrhinus macrostictus Holland, 1893
Celaenorrhinus pooanus Aurivillius, 1910
Celaenorrhinus rutilans (Mabille, 1877)
Eretis melania Mabille, 1891
Sarangesa bouvieri (Mabille, 1877)
Sarangesa brigida sanaga Miller, 1964
Sarangesa motozioides Holland, 1892
Sarangesa tertullianus (Fabricius, 1793)
Sarangesa thecla (Plötz, 1879)
Sarangesa tricerata (Mabille, 1891)

Tagiadini
Tagiades flesus (Fabricius, 1781)
Eagris decastigma fuscosa (Holland, 1893)
Eagris hereus (Druce, 1875)
Eagris subalbida aurivillii (Neustetter, 1927)
Procampta rara Holland, 1892
Abantis nigeriana rougeoti Berger, 1959

Carcharodini
Spialia ploetzi (Aurivillius, 1891)

Hesperiinae

Aeromachini
Prosopalpus debilis (Plötz, 1879)
Gorgyra aretina (Hewitson, 1878)
Gorgyra bina Evans, 1937
Gorgyra kalinzu Evans, 1949
Gorgyra minima Holland, 1896
Gorgyra mocquerysii Holland, 1896
Gorgyra rubescens Holland, 1896
Gorgyra sola Evans, 1937
Gyrogra subnotata (Holland, 1894)
Teniorhinus ignita (Mabille, 1877)
Teniorhinus watsoni Holland, 1892
Teniorhinus niger (Druce, 1910)
Ceratrichia clara medea Evans, 1937
Ceratrichia flava Hewitson, 1878
Ceratrichia phocion camerona Miller, 1971
Ceratrichia semilutea Mabille, 1891
Pardaleodes edipus (Stoll, 1781)
Pardaleodes incerta murcia (Plötz, 1883)
Pardaleodes sator pusiella Mabille, 1877
Pardaleodes tibullus (Fabricius, 1793)
Pardaleodes xanthopeplus Holland, 1892
Xanthodisca astrape (Holland, 1892)
Xanthodisca rega (Mabille, 1890)
Xanthodisca vibius (Hewitson, 1878)
Acada annulifer (Holland, 1892)
Rhabdomantis sosia (Mabille, 1891)
Osmodes adonia Evans, 1937
Osmodes adonides Miller, 1971
Osmodes adosus (Mabille, 1890)
Osmodes costatus Aurivillius, 1896
Osmodes distincta Holland, 1896
Osmodes hollandi Evans, 1937
Osmodes laronia (Hewitson, 1868)
Osmodes lindseyi Miller, 1964
Osmodes lux Holland, 1892
Parosmodes lentiginosa (Holland, 1896)
Paracleros substrigata (Holland, 1893)
Osphantes ogowena (Mabille, 1891)
Acleros ploetzi Mabille, 1890
Semalea pulvina (Plötz, 1879)
Semalea sextilis (Plötz, 1886)
Hypoleucis ophiusa (Hewitson, 1866)
Meza cybeutes (Holland, 1894)
Meza indusiata (Mabille, 1891)
Meza leucophaea (Holland, 1894)
Meza mabea (Holland, 1894)
Meza mabillei (Holland, 1893)
Paronymus budonga (Evans, 1938)
Paronymus xanthias (Mabille, 1891)
Paronymus xanthioides (Holland, 1892)
Andronymus caesar (Fabricius, 1793)
Andronymus evander (Mabille, 1890)
Andronymus helles Evans, 1937
Andronymus hero Evans, 1937
Andronymus neander (Plötz, 1884)
Zophopetes ganda Evans, 1937
Zophopetes nobilior (Holland, 1896)
Gamia buchholzi (Plötz, 1879)
Gamia shelleyi (Sharpe, 1890)
Artitropa comus (Stoll, 1782)
Mopala orma (Plötz, 1879)
Gretna balenge (Holland, 1891)
Gretna cylinda (Hewitson, 1876)
Gretna lacida (Hewitson, 1876)
Gretna waga (Plötz, 1886)
Pteroteinon caenira (Hewitson, 1867)
Pteroteinon iricolor (Holland, 1890)
Pteroteinon laterculus (Holland, 1890)
Pteroteinon laufella (Hewitson, 1868)
Leona binoevatus (Mabille, 1891)
Leona lena Evans, 1937
Leona leonora (Plötz, 1879)
Caenides soritia (Hewitson, 1876)
Caenides kangvensis Holland, 1896
Caenides benga (Holland, 1891)
Caenides dacela (Hewitson, 1876)
Caenides dacena (Hewitson, 1876)
Monza alberti (Holland, 1896)
Melphina melphis (Holland, 1893)
Melphina statira (Mabille, 1891)
Melphina statirides (Holland, 1896)
Melphina unistriga (Holland, 1893)
Fresna netopha (Hewitson, 1878)
Platylesches galesa (Hewitson, 1877)

Baorini
Borbo fallax (Gaede, 1916)
Borbo fanta (Evans, 1937)
Borbo holtzi (Plötz, 1883)
Parnara monasi (Trimen & Bowker, 1889)

Heteropterinae
Lepella lepeletier (Latreille, 1824)

See also
Geography of Gabon
List of ecoregions in Gabon

References

Seitz, A. Die Gross-Schmetterlinge der Erde 13: Die Afrikanischen Tagfalter. Plates
Seitz, A. Die Gross-Schmetterlinge der Erde 13: Die Afrikanischen Tagfalter. Text 

Butterflies
Gabon
Gabon
Gabon
Butterflies